Anula Karunathilaka (born 23 January 1946) is a Sri Lankan film actress and theatrical performer. Her work is noted during the 70s film and cinema history in Sri Lanka. One of the most popular actresses in Sinhala cinema in 1960s, she is best known for the popular role 'Dammi' in the blockbuster film Golu Hadawatha.

Personal life
She was born on 23 January 1946 in Wellawatte, Colombo, Sri Lanka as the second of the family. Her father, Thomas Karunatilake had a shop in Wellawatte Market. Her mother Somawathi was a housewife. She has one older sister and two younger sisters. She completed education from Sri Lankadhaara Girls' School in Wellawatte.

She was married to Daya Ranaweera, who worked at Dawasa Newspaper. They wedding was celebrated in March 1968 when Anula was 22 years old. The couple had two sons. Daya died in 2001.

Career 
Karunathilaka's entry into the industry in the early 1960s came about as a result of a chance meeting with senior film industry figures at a beauty contest organized by the Dawasa newspaper in 1962. Having applied as a contestant at her sister's insistence, her photo was published in the newspaper among the other candidates' for the public to vote on. Filmmakers Sumitra Peries and Tissa Abeysekera were among the audience of the final event and, using the photo published in the newspaper, identified Karunathilaka during the day's proceedings. A week later, Sugathapala de Silva and G. W. Surendra visited the Karunathilakas' home with a message from Lester James Peries, Peries, and Abeysekera, inviting her to audition for the role of Nanda in Lester James' upcoming Gamperaliya. Despite her interest, Lester decided her to be too young for the part, and instead gave her the role of Liza, auditioning for the part in a scene alongside Gamini Fonseka. She thus made her on-screen debut at 16.

Karunathilika played a role in the local film industry's efforts to produce truly local performances, moving away from highly Indianized productions and plots.

Acting style
Karunathilaka was an acclaimed popular and awarded actress. She is known for character acting. Her style is said to derive from her nurturing under strict culture and family restrictions in the 1940s.

Key performances 
Golu Hadawatha made many notable contributions to Sinhala cinema, and became one of the most popular actresses in the late 1960s. Her most important role was as Dhammi in Golu Hadawatha (Silent Heart). Karunathilka was awarded with national Sarasaviya Awards in 1969 for the role. Another key role was Sugath.

Personal life
Karunathilaka was married to photographer and journalist Daya Ranaweera.

Awards
1965 - Sarasaviya  Award - Popular Actress
1969 - Sarasaviya Award - Best Actress - Golu Hadawatha
2011 - UV Sumathipala Memorial Award

Selected works

Filmography

Television
 Aba Yaluwo
 Bhavathra
 Ganga Addara 
 Hirusanda Maima 
 Laabai Apple
 Mahathala Hatana 
 Rosa Katu 
 Sayaweni Patumaga 
 Senehase Nimnaya 
 Sepalika
 Sith Bindi Rekha 
 Tharuka

Theater
 Boarding Karayo
 Ranthodu

References

External links 
 
 
 
 
 
 
  
  
 
 
 
 
 
 දම්මි තක්ෂිලාවට

1946 births
Living people
Sri Lankan film actresses
Sinhalese actresses
20th-century Sri Lankan actresses
21st-century Sri Lankan actresses